was a town located in Kitamatsuura District, Nagasaki Prefecture, Japan.

As of 2003, the town had an estimated population of 3,560 and a density of 134.85 persons per km². The total area was 26.40 km².

On March 1, 2006, Uku, along with the town of Kosaza (also from Kitamatsuura District), was merged into the expanded city of Sasebo.

Uku can be accessed by ferry from Fukuoka's Hakata port as well as a number of ferries departing from Sasebo ferry port daily.

External links
 Sasebo official website 
 Merger consultation, Ministry of Internal Affairs and Communications (Japanese)

Dissolved municipalities of Nagasaki Prefecture
Sasebo